The National Corporate Party was a fascist political party in Ireland founded by Eoin O'Duffy in June 1935 at a meeting of 500. It split from Fine Gael when O'Duffy was removed as leader of that party, which had been founded by the merger of O'Duffy's Blueshirts, formally known as the National Guard or Army Comrades Association, with Cumann na nGaedheal, and the National Centre Party.

The National Corporate Party wished to establish a corporate state in Ireland and was strongly anti-communist. Its military wing was the Greenshirts. Around eighty of the Blueshirts later became Greenshirts. The party raised funds through public dances. Unlike the Blueshirts, whose aim had been the establishment of a corporate state while remaining within the British Commonwealth in order to appease moderates within Fine Gael, the National Corporate Party was committed to the establishment of a republic outside of the British Empire with O'Duffy presenting his party as the true successor to the ideals of the Easter Rising. The party also committed itself to the preservation and promotion of the Irish language and Gaelic culture, something that would be echoed by a later fascist party in Ireland, Ailtirí na hAiséirghe. 

It failed to gain much support however, with the majority of Fine Gael members remaining loyal to that party and O'Duffy only securing a handful of loyal supporters for his group.

O'Duffy left Ireland in 1936 to lead a volunteer Irish Brigade in the Spanish Civil War, an action which led to further decline in the National Corporate Party. He retired on his return in 1937. Without him, both the Greenshirts and National Corporate Party faded away. The party was defunct by 1937.

References

Sources
The Greenshirts: fascism in the Irish Free State 1935-1945 - Queen Mary University of London

1935 establishments in Ireland
1937 disestablishments in Ireland
Anti-communist parties
Corporatism
Defunct political parties in the Republic of Ireland
Far-right politics in Ireland
Fascist parties
Irish fascists
Irish republican parties
Political parties disestablished in 1937
Political parties established in 1935